Burley Griffin may refer to:
Lake Burley Griffin, a lake in Canberra, Australia
Walter Burley Griffin, American architect and landscape architect